Ljubljana Jože Pučnik Airport , also known by its previous name Brnik Airport, is the international airport serving Ljubljana and the largest airport in Slovenia.

History
The airport was officially opened in December 1963. It replaced Polje Airport in the former Municipality of Polje near Ljubljana, which served as the city's airport from 1933 and was Slovenia's first civil airport. Regular flights from the new airport at Brnik began in January 1964.

In the 1980s, Jat Airways offered nonstop flights from North America to Ljubljana. The airline employed McDonnell Douglas DC-10s on a route from New York City to the then Yugoslav city once a week; passengers had to connect through Belgrade when travelling in the opposite direction.

On 27 June 1991, two days after Slovenia's Independence from Yugoslavia, the Yugoslav People's Army began its military operations within the country. The airport was bombed during the first day of the war. The next day, 28 June, two journalists from Austria and Germany, Nikolas Vogel and Norbert Werner, were killed from a missile that struck their car near the airport, where they were both driving by during that time. Four Adria Airways airliners also took serious damage from the Yugoslav Air Force.

Finally on 29 June, the JPA soldiers at the Airport surrendered to Slovenian TO forces, who surrounded the entire facility overnight. The fighting ended on 7 July with the Brioni Agreement.

On 8 December 2004, the airport received its first annual millionth passenger. Overall, the airport handled 1,721,355 passengers in 2019, representing a 5% drop in traffic figures compared to the previous year.

In 2007, the right-wing government proposed renaming the airport from Aerodrom Ljubljana to Ljubljana Jože Pučnik Airport. Jože Pučnik was a Slovene right-wing public intellectual, dissident, politician, and leader of the Democratic Opposition of Slovenia (Demos) between 1989 and 1992.

Due to growing air traffic and Slovenia's EU entry, which requires the separation of traffic into Schengen and non-Schengen, Aerodrom Ljubljana Airport Authorities have prepared a redevelopment plan for the passenger terminal. The expansion was to be carried out in two phases. Works on the first phase began in early July 2007 to accommodate Slovenia's entry into the Schengen Area in December 2007. The terminal building (T1) was extended with a new upper level which added an additional  to the departure lounge and four jetways have also been installed for easier passenger access to and from the terminal. In 2013, the second phase of terminal expansion which included a new terminal T2 was scrapped by the minority stakeholders.

In 2014, the Slovenian government initiated a privatisation process of the airport. The bid was won by Fraport which, in turn, acquired 75.5% stake in the airport. The remaining shares were acquired in the following months resulting in Fraport taking 100% ownership of the airport.

Facilities

Runway
The airport has a  paved runway which is equipped with ILS Cat IIIb on runway 30. NDB and VOR approach are also available. The runway of Ljubljana Jože Pučnik Airport was closed to air traffic in April 2010 during which time, the entire length of the asphalt surface of the runway was renovated, as well as the asphalt surface on some parts of the taxiways.

Expansion plan
In April 2017 the airport operator Fraport Slovenia announced a plan to expand the existing passenger terminal. A modular solution was proposed which can be carried out in phases that are effectively and continuously adapted to traffic development needs.

The first phase of the terminal expansion was opened for traffic in July 2021. The capacity of the departures area was increased from 500 passengers per hour to 1,250 passengers per hour. A new  extension was built to the west of the old terminal building. It includes a large duty-free shop, a new business lounge, one new air bridge, as well as renovated food & beverage and promotional areas. There are 22 check-in desks and 5 long security lines available. A new baggage sorting area was also added and the baggage reclaim area was expanded and equipped with two long carousels.

The construction began in July 2019 and was completed in June 2021 in time for Slovenia's Presidency of the Council of the European Union.

In 2017 Fraport Slovenija also published a revised Master Plan for the period 2010–2040. It includes a plan to construct a new  cargo terminal to the east of the airport complex, expansion of passenger and aircraft maintenance aprons and a relocation of the general aviation apron to the west. To the north, a business and logistics center named Airport City is planned. It will include various business and logistic facilities as well as a new hotel, there are multiple subsidies as well as incentives for the potential investor. In January 2018 a new road from Kranj to Mengeš that will enable the development of the Airport City has been opened.

Airlines and destinations

Passenger 
The following airlines operate regular scheduled and seasonal flights to and from Ljubljana Jože Pučnik Airport:

Cargo

Statistics

Traffic figures and development

International traffic per country

Ground transport
The airport is served by an exit off the A2 motorway and by bus services connecting it with the surrounding cities of Ljubljana, Kranj, Kamnik as well as Klagenfurt and its airport in Austria. Plans for a railway line connecting the airport with the city of Ljubljana and possibly also Kranj and Kamnik have been presented in the past, however the line most likely won't be built in the near future. The Airport is connected with many bigger Slovenian cities by bus and shuttle connections. Klagenfurt is connected by the Alpe Adria bus line. Other means of transportation to and from the airport are limited to the taxi services which are not controlled by the airport authority or Fraport Slovenija, and shared shuttle service with ticket sale point in the main arrival lobby. The price of a taxi will be considerably lower if you book online.

See also
List of airports in Slovenia
Transport in Slovenia

References

External links

Official Airport website
Official Corporate website

 
 https://www.exyuaviation.com/2020/12/photos-ljubljanas-new-terminal-nears.html

Airports in Slovenia
Airport
Airports established in 1963
1963 establishments in Slovenia
20th-century architecture in Slovenia